The Baltimore Orioles' 2007 season involved the Orioles finishing with a record of 69 wins and 93 losses and fourth place in the AL East. On June 18, 2007, manager Sam Perlozzo was fired and  replaced with bullpen coach Dave Trembley as interim manager. Trembley was named full-time manager on August 22, 2007.  On this same day, the Orioles suffered a 30 to 3 loss to the Texas Rangers, the most lopsided loss in franchise history. Perlozzo's record was 29 wins and 40 losses and Trembley's was 40 wins and 53 losses.

Offseason
November 12, 2006: Jaret Wright was traded by the New York Yankees with cash to the Baltimore Orioles for Chris Britton.
February 2, 2007: Paul Shuey was signed as a free agent with the Baltimore Orioles.

Regular season

Season standings

Record vs. opponents

Transactions
June 30, 2007: Gustavo Molina was acquired of waivers from the Chicago White Sox.
August 9, 2007: Minor league player Sebastien Bouchier was acquired from the Seattle Mariners in exchange for John Parrish.
August 9, 2007: Chris Gomez was acquired off waivers from the Baltimore Orioles by the Cleveland Indians.
August 31, 2007: Steve Trachsel was acquired from the Chicago Cubs in exchange for Scott Moore and Rocky Cherry.
September 5, 2007: Paul Shuey was released by the Baltimore Orioles.
September 7, 2007: Víctor Santos was acquired from the Cincinnati Reds in exchange for cash.
September 9, 2007: Víctor Zambrano was acquired from the Pittsburgh Pirates in exchange for cash.

Rangers 30, Orioles 3

On August 22 of the season, the Orioles were slated to play against the Texas Rangers in a doubleheader, as the two teams had their game on August 20 postponed due to rain. Both teams were well out of contention by this point, with the Rangers at 54-70 and the Orioles at 58–65, and it was the first game for manager Dave Trembley in a full-time capacity, as he had served as an interim manager since June 19.

Every batter for the Rangers recorded at least two hits, with eight of the nine batters reaching home plate to score twice (with the exception of Michael Young, who left in the seventh inning after scoring once); incidentally, every Oriole pitcher (four used) allowed at least six runs to score. Wes Littleton, who came in when the score was 14–3 in the seventh inning, received the save for his three innings of work; the offensive explosion of sixteen runs after he came in helped set a new record for the largest margin of victory in a game with a save, and the previous record was coincidentally a win by the Rangers over the Orioles (26-7, April 19, 1996).

The victory set a record for most runs scored by an American League team in one game while being the most runs scored by a team since the Chicago Colts in 1897 (who scored 36 against the Louisville Colonels on June 29); it was the ninth time a team had scored 30 runs in a game. The 29 hits were the most by a team in a game since August 28, 1992, when Milwaukee recorded 33 hits against Toronto. Less than an hour after the game, the two teams played the second game of the doubleheader, which the Rangers won 9–7.

Game log

|- style="background-color:#ffbbbb"
| 1 || April 2 || @ Twins || 7 – 4 || Santana (1-0) || Bédard (0-1) || Nathan (1) || 48,711 || 0-1
|- style="background-color:#ffbbbb"
| 2 || April 3 || @ Twins || 3 – 2 || Neshek (1-0) || Cabrera (0-1) || Nathan (2)|| 24,439 || 0-2
|- style="background-color:#ffbbbb"
| 3 || April 4 || @ Twins|| 7 – 2 || Ortiz (1-0) || Wright (0-1) || || 27,539 || 0-3
|- style="background-color:#bbffbb"
| 4 || April 6 || @ Yankees || 6 – 4 || Loewen (1-0) || Mussina (0-1) || Ray (1) || 50,074 || 1-3
|- style="background-color:#ffbbbb"
| 5 || April 7 || @ Yankees || 10 – 7 || Rivera (1-0) || Ray (0-1) || || 50,510 || 1-4
|- style="background-color:#bbffbb"
| 6 || April 8 || @ Yankees || 6 – 4 || Bédard (1-1) || Rasner (0-1) || Ray (2) || 47,679 || 2-4
|- style="background-color:#bbffbb"
| 7 || April 9 || Tigers || 6 – 2 || Cabrera (1-1) || Durbin (0-1) || || 48,159 || 3-4
|- style="background-color:#ffbbbb"
| 8 || April 10 || Tigers || 3 – 1 || Robertson (2-0) || Wright (0-2) || Jones (4) || 18,594 || 3-5
|- style="background-color:#ffbbbb"
| 9 || April 11 || Tigers || 4 – 1  || Ledezma (1-0) || Birkins (0-1) || Jones (5) || 13,288 || 3-6
|- style="background-color:#bbffbb"
| 10 || April 12 || Royals || 2 – 1  || Ray (1-1) || Standridge (0-1) || || 13,229 || 4-6
|- style="background-color:#bbffbb"
| 11 || April 13 || Royals || 8 – 1 || Bédard (2-1) || Duckworth (0-1) || || 20,922 || 5-6
|- style="background-color:#bbffbb"
| 12 || April 14 || Royals || 6 – 4 || Williamson (1-0) || Jo. Peralta (0-1) || Ray (3) || 15,244 || 6-6
|- style="background-color:#bbbbbb"
| -- || April 15 || Royals || colspan=5|Postponed (rain)  || 6-6
|- style="background-color:#bbffbb"
| 13 || April 16 || @ Devil Rays || 9 – 7 || Guthrie (1-0) || Ryu (1-1) || Ray (4) || 9,157 || 7-6
|- style="background-color:#ffbbbb"
| 14 || April 17 || @ Devil Rays || 6 – 4 || Fossum (1-1) || Trachsel (0-1) || Al Reyes (5) || 9,575 || 7-7
|- style="background-color:#bbffbb"
| 15 || April 18 || @ Devil Rays || 6 – 4 || Bédard (3-1) || Glover (0-1) || Ray (5) || 10,540 || 8-7
|- style="background-color:#bbffbb"
| 16 || April 20 || Blue Jays || 5 – 4 || Ray (2-1) || Zambrano (0-1) ||  || 25,025 || 9-7
|- style="background-color:#bbffbb"
| 17 || April 21 || Blue Jays || 5 – 2 || Loewen (2-0) || Towers (1-2) || Ray (6) || 25,898 || 10-7
|- style="background-color:#bbffbb"
| 18 || April 22 || Blue Jays || 7 – 3 || Trachsel (1-1) || Chacín (2-1) || || 27,285 || 11-7
|- style="background-color:#ffbbbb"
| 19 || April 23 || Athletics || 6 – 5 || Haren (2-2) || Bédard (3-2) || Street (5) || 13,862  || 11-8
|- style="background-color:#ffbbbb"
| 20 || April 24 || Athletics || 4 – 2 || Braden (1-0) || Guthrie (1-1) || Street (6) || 14,452 || 11-9
|- style="background-color:#ffbbbb"
| 21 || April 25 || Red Sox || 6 – 1 || Schilling (3-1) || Cabrera (1-2) || || 27,613 || 11-10
|- style="background-color:#ffbbbb"
| 22 || April 26 || Red Sox || 5 – 2 || Beckett (5-0) || Ray (2-2) || Papelbon (7) || 33,522 || 11-11
|- style="background-color:#ffbbbb"
| 23 || April 27 || @ Indians || 5 – 4 || Westbrook (1-2) || Trachsel (1-2) || Borowski (9) || 20,484 || 11-12
|- style="background-color:#bbffbb"
| 24 || April 28 || @ Indians || 7 – 4 || Walker (1-0) || Cabrera (1-1) || Ray (7) || 25,065 || 12-12
|- style="background-color:#ffbbbb"
| 25 || April 29 || @ Indians || 6 – 1 || Carmona (2-1) || Wright (0-3) || || 25,402 || 12-13
|- style="background-color:#ffbbbb"
| 26 || April 30 || @ Tigers || 8 – 4 ||Bonderman (1-0) || Cabrera (1-3)|| Rodney (1) || 24,914 || 12-14

|- style="background-color:#ffbbbb"
| 27 || May 1 || @ Tigers || 5 – 4 ||Zumaya (1-1) || Báez (0-1) || Jones (9) || 23,126 || 12-15
|- style="background-color:#ffbbbb"
| 28 || May 2 || @ Tigers || 3 – 2 ||Robertson (3-1) || Trachsel (1-3) || Jones (10) || 29,278 || 12-16
|- style="background-color:#bbffbb"
| 29 || May 4 || Indians || 3 – 2  || Ray (3-2) || Mastny (2-1) || || 28,575 || 13-16
|- style="background-color:#bbffbb"
| 30 || May 5 || Indians || 8 – 2 || Cabrera (2-3) || Sowers (0-2) || || 25,752 || 14-16
|- style="background-color:#ffbbbb"
| 31 || May 6 || Indians || 9 – 6 || Sabathia (5-0) || Burres (0-1) || Borowski (11) || 37,464 || 14-17
|- style="background-color:#ffbbbb"
| 32 || May 7 || Indians || 10 – 1 || Carmona (3-1) || Bradford (0-1) || || 17,944 || 14-18
|- style="background-color:#bbffbb"
| 33 || May 8 || Devil Rays || 8 – 3 || Guthrie (2-1) || Seo (1-3) || || 17,818 || 15-18
|- style="background-color:#bbffbb"
| 34 || May 9 || Devil Rays || 1 – 0  || Parrish (1-0) || Stokes (1-4) || || 14,780 || 16-18
|- style="background-color:#bbffbb"
| 35 || May 10 || Devil Rays || 11 – 6 || Cabrera (3-3) || Fossum (2-3) || || 15,915 || 17-18
|- style="background-color:#bbffbb"
| 36 || May 11 || @ Red Sox || 6 – 3 || Burres (1-1) || Tavárez (1-4) || Ray (8) || 37,039 || 18-18
|- style="background-color:#ffbbbb"
| 37 || May 12 || @ Red Sox || 13 – 4 || López (1-0) || Leicester (0-1) || || 36,503 || 18-19
|- style="background-color:#ffbbbb"
| 38 || May 13 || @ Red Sox || 6 – 5 || Romero (1-0) || Ray (3-3) || || 36,379 || 18-20
|- style="background-color:#ffbbbb"
| 39 || May 14 || @ Blue Jays || 5 – 3 || Janssen (1-0) || Báez (0-2) || Accardo (2) || 19,819 || 18-21
|- style="background-color:#ffbbbb"
| 40 || May 15 || @ Blue Jays || 2 – 1 || Litsch (1-0) || Cabrera (3-4) || Accardo (3) || 30,958 || 18-22
|- style="background-color:#ffbbbb"
| 41 || May 16 || @ Blue Jays || 2 – 1 || Burnett (4-3) || Burres (1-2) || || 24,339 || 18-23
|- style="background-color:#bbffbb"
| 42 || May 18 || @ Nationals || 5 – 4 || Trachsel (2-3) || Simontacchi (1-2) || Ray (9) || 22,375 || 19-23
|- style="background-color:#bbffbb"
| 43 || May 19 || @ Nationals || 3 – 2  || Parrish (2-0) || Abreu (0-1) || Ray (10) || 30,661 || 20-23
|- style="background-color:#ffbbbb"
| 44 || May 20 || @ Nationals || 4 – 3 || Colomé (2-0) || Báez (0-3) || Cordero (5) || 29,281 || 20-24
|- style="background-color:#ffbbbb"
| 45 || May 22 || Blue Jays ||  6 – 4 || Burnett (5-3) || Cabrera (3-5) || Accardo (4)  || 17,852  || 20-24
|- style="background-color:#bbffbb"
| 46 || May 23 || Blue Jays || 5 – 2 || Trachsel (3-3) || McGowan (0-2) || Ray (11) || 16,938 || 21-25
|- style="background-color:#ffbbbb"
| 47 || May 24 || Blue Jays || 5 – 4  || Janssen (2-0) || Báez (0-4) || Accardo (5) || 15,182 || 21-26
|- style="background-color:#ffbbbb"
| 48 || May 25 || Athletics || 3 - 2 || Haren (5-2) || Bédard (3-3) || Embree (2) || 30,382 || 21-27
|- style="background-color:#bbffbb"
| 49 || May 26 || Athletics || 8 – 3 || Burres (2-2) || Kennedy (1-4) || || 29,194 || 22-27
|- style="background-color:#bbffbb"
| 50 || May 27 || Athletics || 8 – 4 || Cabrera (4-5) || Blanton (4-3) ||  || 30,140 || 23-27
|- style="background-color:#bbffbb"
| 51 || May 28 || @ Royals || 9 – 1 || Trachsel (4-3) || Elarton (1-1) || || 14,758 || 24-27
|- style="background-color:#bbffbb"
| 52 || May 29 || @ Royals || 6 – 2 || Guthrie (3-1) || de la Rosa (4-5) || || 13,556 || 25-27
|- style="background-color:#bbffbb"
| 53 || May 30 || @ Royals || 3 – 0 || Bédard (4-3) || Meche (3-4) || Ray (12) || 10,513 || 26-27
|- style="background-color:#bbffbb"
| 54 || May 31 || @ Angels || 6 – 2 || Burres (3-2) || Escobar (6-3) || || 42,266 || 27-27

|- style="background-color:#ffbbbb"
| 55 || June 1 || @ Angels || 3 – 2 || Lackey (9-3) || Cabrera (4-6) || Rodríguez (19) || 43,012 || 27-28
|- style="background-color:#ffbbbb"
| 56 || June 2 || @ Angels || 7 – 4 || Saunders (3-0) || Trachsel (4-4) || || 42,190 || 27-29
|- style="background-color:#ffbbbb"
| 57 || June 3 || @ Angels || 4 – 3 || Bootcheck (1-0) || Ray (3-4) || || 41,026 || 27-30
|- style="background-color:#ffbbbb"
| 58 || June 4 || @ Mariners || 5 – 4 || Sherrill (2-0) || Bradford (0-2) || Putz (14) || 19,090 || 27-31
|- style="background-color:#ffbbbb"
| 59 || June 5 || @ Mariners || 5 – 4 || Davis (1-0) || Walker (1-1) || Putz (15) || 19,287 || 27-32
|- style="background-color:#bbffbb"
| 60 || June 6 || @ Mariners || 9 – 5 || Cabrera (5-6) || Washburn (5-5) || || 29,010 || 28-32
|- style="background-color:#bbffbb"
| 61 || June 8 || Rockies || 4 – 2 || Trachsel (5-4) || Francis (5-5) || Ray (13) || 22,375 || 29-32
|- style="background-color:#ffbbbb"
| 62 || June 9 || Rockies || 3 – 2  || Affeldt (4-1) || Williams (0-1) || Fuentes (18) || 27,320 || 29-33
|- style="background-color:#ffbbbb"
| 63 || June 10 || Rockies || 6 – 1 || Hirsh (3-6) || Bédard (4-4) || || 34,784  || 29-34
|- style="background-color:#ffbbbb"
| 64 || June 12 || Nationals || 7 – 4 || Bowie (3-2) || Cabrera (5-7) || Cordero (9) || 21,151 || 29-35
|- style="background-color:#ffbbbb"
| 65 || June 13 || Nationals || 9 – 6  || Traber (2-0) || Ray (3-5) || S. Rivera (3) || 21,782 || 29-36
|- style="background-color:#ffbbbb"
| 66 || June 14 || Nationals || 3 – 1 || Simontacchi (4-4) || Bradford (0-3) || Cordero (10) || 20,770 || 29-37
|- style="background-color:#ffbbbb"
| 67 || June 15 || D-backs || 7 – 3 || Slaten (3-0) || Williams (0-2) || || 26,174 || 29-38
|- style="background-color:#ffbbbb"
| 68 || June 16 || D-backs ||  8 – 4 || González (3-2) || Cabrera (5-8) || || 26,964 || 29-39
|- style="background-color:#ffbbbb"
| 69 || June 17 || D-backs || 6 – 4  || Webb (7-4) || Bradford (0-4) || Valverde (22) || 27,934 || 29-40
|- style="background-color:#ffbbbb"
| 70 || June 19 || @ Padres || 12 – 6 || Peavy (9-1) || Trachsel (5-5) || || 38,181 || 29-41
|- style="background-color:#bbffbb"
| 71 || June 20 || @ Padres || 7 – 1 || Guthrie (4-1) || Germano (5-1) || || 26,931 || 30-41
|- style="background-color:#bbffbb"
| 72 || June 21 || @ Padres || 6 – 3 || Bédard (5-4) || Wells (3-5)  || || 40,680 || 31-41
|- style="background-color:#bbffbb"
| 73 || June 22 || @ D-backs || 7 – 1 || Cabrera (6-8) || Webb (7-5) || || 21,722 || 32-41
|- style="background-color:#ffbbbb"
| 74 || June 23 || @ D-backs || 7 – 4 || Cruz (3-1) || Bell (0-1) || Valverde (24) || 29,832 || 32-42
|- style="background-color:#ffbbbb"
| 75 || June 24 || @ D-backs || 8 – 3 || Davis (5-8) || Trachsel (5-6) || || 27,744 || 32-43
|- style="background-color:#bbffbb"
| 76 || June 26 || Yankees || 3 – 2 || Ray (4-5) || Proctor (1-5) || || 39,934 || 33-43
|- style="background-color:#bbffbb"
| 77 || June 27 || Yankees || 4 – 0 || Bédard (6-4) || Clemens (1-3) || || 35,776 || 34-43
|- style="background-color:#ffbbbb"
| 78 || June 28 || Yankees || 8 – 7* || Myers (1-0) || Parrish (2-1) || Rivera (10) || 40,737 || 34-44
|- style="background-color:#ffbbbb"
| 79 || June 29 || Angels || 9 – 7 || Shields (2-2) || Ray (4-6) || Rodríguez (23) || 36,689 || 34-45
|- style="background-color:#bbffbb"
| 80 || June 30 || Angels || 6 – 3 || Burres (4-2) || Colón (6-4) || Shuey (1) || 26,235 || 35-45
|-
| colspan=8 | *Game suspended, completed July 27

|- style="background-color:#ffbbbb"
| 81 || July 1 || Angels || 4 – 3 || Lackey (11-6) || Guthrie (4-2) || Rodríguez (24) || 25,058 || 35-46
|- style="background-color:#bbffbb"
| 82 || July 2 || @ White Sox || 7 – 6 || Bell (1-1) || Jenks (2-4) || Ray (14) || 35,161 || 36-46
|- style="background-color:#ffbbbb"
| 83 || July 3 || @ White Sox || 5 – 1 || Vázquez (5-5) || Cabrera (6-9) || || 37,281 || 36-47
|- style="background-color:#bbffbb"
| 84 || July 4 || @ White Sox || 9 – 6 || Bell (2-1) || Contreras (5-10) || || 33,640 || 37-47
|- style="background-color:#ffbbbb"
| 85 || July 5 || @ White Sox || 11 – 4 || Danks (5-6) || Burres (4-3) || || 30,364 || 37-48
|- style="background-color:#ffbbbb"
| 86 || July 6 || @ Rangers || 4 – 3  || Benoit (3-2)|| Shuey (0-1) || || 24,035 || 37-49
|- style="background-color:#bbffbb"
| 87 || July 7 || @ Rangers || 3 – 0 || Bédard (7-4) || McCarthy (4-6) || || 32,849 || 38-49
|- style="background-color:#ffbbbb"
| 88 || July 8 || @ Rangers || 2 – 1 || Millwood (6-7) || Cabrera (6-10) || Gagné (12) || 22,843 || 38-50
|- style="background-color:#ffbbbb"
| 89 || July 12 || White Sox || 9 – 7 || Garland (7-6) || Guthrie (4-3) || Jenks (24) || 21,000 || 38-51
|- style="background-color:#bbffbb"
| 90 || July 13 || White Sox || 2 – 0 || Bédard (8-4) || Buehrle (6-5) || Ray (15) || 28,162 || 39-51
|- style="background-color:#bbffbb"
| 91 || July 14 || White Sox || 7 – 6  || Ray (5-6) || Haeger (0-1) || || 29,208 || 40-51
|- style="background-color:#bbffbb"
| 92 || July 15 || White Sox || 5 – 3 || Olson (1-0) || Contreras (5-11) || Ray (16) || 29,382 || 41-51
|- style="background-color:#ffbbbb"
| 93 || July 16 || @ Mariners || 4 – 2 || Ramírez (5-2) || Burres (4-4) || Putz (27) || 23,128 || 41-52
|- style="background-color:#bbffbb"
| 94 || July 17 || @ Mariners || 8 – 3 || Guthrie (5-3) || Hernández (6-5) ||  || 22,470 ||  42-52
|- style="background-color:#ffbbbb"
| 95 || July 18 || @ Mariners || 6 – 5 || Green (3-1) || Báez (0-5) || Putz (28) || 28,550 || 42-53
|- style="background-color:#bbffbb"
| 96 || July 20 || @ Athletics || 6 – 1 || Bédard (9-4) || Blanton (8-7) || || 18,444 || 43-53
|- style="background-color:#ffbbbb"
| 97 || July 21 || @ Athletics || 4 – 3 || Haren (11-3) || Trachsel (5-7) || Embree (10) || 30,828 || 43-54
|- style="background-color:#bbffbb"
| 98 || July 22 || @ Athletics || 2 – 0 || Guthrie (6-3) || Braden (1-5)  || Walker (1) || 25,552 || 44-54
|- style="background-color:#bbffbb"
| 99 || July 24 || Devil Rays || 3 – 0 || Cabrera (7-10) || Kazmir (7-7) || Walker (2) || 42,579 || 45-54
|- style="background-color:#bbffbb"
| 100 || July 25 || Devil Rays || 6 – 1 || Bédard (10-4) || Sonnanstine (1-6) || || 21,427 || 46-54
|- style="background-color:#bbffbb"
| 101 || July 26 || Devil Rays || 10 – 7 || Bell (3-1) || Jackson (2-10) || || 22,393 || 47-54
|- style="background-color:#bbffbb"
| 102 || July 27 || Yankees || 4 – 2 || Guthrie (7-3) || Pettitte (6-7) || Bradford (1) || 47,952 || 48-54
|- style="background-color:#ffbbbb"
| 103 || July 28 || Yankees || 7 – 5 || Burres (5-4) || Clemens (3-5) || Walker (3) || 48,402 || 49-54
|- style="background-color:#ffbbbb"
| 104 || July 29 || Yankees || 10 – 6 || Wang (12-5) || Cabrera (7-11) || || 47,936 || 49-55
|- style="background-color:#bbffbb"
| 105 || July 31 || @ Red Sox || 5 – 3 || Bédard (11-4) || Beckett (13-5) || Walker (4) || 36,866 || 50-55

|- style="background-color:#fbbbbb"
| 106 || August 1 || @ Red Sox || 5 – 4 || López (2-1) || Parrish (2-2) || Papelbon (24) || 36,649 || 50-56
|- style="background-color:#ffbbbb"
| 107 || August 2 || @ Red Sox || 7 – 4 || Wakefield (13-9) || Bell (3-2) || || 36,457 || 50-57
|- style="background-color:#bbffbb"
| 108 || August 3 || @ Devil Rays || 3 – 1 || Cabrera (8-11) || Shields (8-7) || Báez (1) || 15,542 || 51-57
|- style="background-color:#ffbbbb"
| 109 || August 4 || @ Devil Rays || 9 – 2 || Kazmir (8-7) || Burres (5-5) || || 18,230 || 51-58
|- style="background-color:#bbffbb"
| 110 || August 5 || @ Devil Rays || 11 – 3 || Bédard (12-4) || Sonnanstine (1-7) || || 19,845 || 52-58
|- style="background-color:#ffbbbb"
| 111 || August 7 || Mariners || 10 – 3 || Weaver (3-10) || Walker (1-2) ||  || 25,060 || 52-59
|- style="background-color:#ffbbbb"
| 112 || August 8 || Mariners || 8 – 4 || Hernández (8-6) || Guthrie (7-4) || Putz (33) || 17,511 || 52-60
|- style="background-color:#ffbbbb"
| 113 || August 9 || Mariners || 13 – 8 || Ramírez (7-3) || Cabrera (8-12) || Sherrill (1) || 18,679 || 52-61
|- style="background-color:#bbffbb"
| 114 || August 10 || Red Sox || 6 – 5 || Hoey (1-0) || Okajima (3-1) || || 48,993 || 53-61
|- style="background-color:#ffbbbb"
| 115 || August 11 || Red Sox || 6 – 2 || Beckett (15-5) || Olson (1-1) || Papelbon (27) || 49,242 || 53-62
|- style="background-color:#bbffbb"
| 116 || August 12 || Red Sox || 6 – 3  || Bradford (1-4) || Snyder (2-3) || || 48,551 || 54-62
|- style="background-color:#ffbbbb"
| 117 || August 13 || @ Yankees || 7 – 6 || Rivera (3-3) || Bradford (1-5) || || 54,398 || 54-63
|- style="background-color:#bbffbb"
| 118 || August 14 || @ Yankees || 12 – 0 || Cabrera (9-12) || Karstens (0-3) || || 52,567 || 55-63
|- style="background-color:#bbffbb"
| 119 || August 15 || @ Yankees || 6 – 3  || Bradford (2-5) || Rivera (3-4) || || 53,363 || 56-63
|- style="background-color:#ffbbbb"
| 120 || August 17 || @ Blue Jays || 5 – 2 || Burnett (7-6) || Olson (1-2) || Accardo (24) || 25,524 || 56-64
|- style="background-color:#bbffbb"
| 121 || August 18 || @ Blue Jays || 5 – 3 || Trachsel (6-7) || Litsch (4-6) || Báez (2) || 33,387 || 57-64
|- style="background-color:#ffbbbb"
| 122 || August 19 || @ Blue Jays || 3 – 2  || Downs (2-2) || Bradford (2-6) || || 38,132 || 57-65
|- style="background-color:#bbbbbb"
| -- || August 20 || Rangers || colspan=5|Postponed (rain)  || 57-65
|- style="background-color:#bbffbb"
| 123 || August 21 || Rangers || 6 – 2 || Bédard (13-4) || Padilla (3-9) || || 18,926 || 58-65
|- style="background-color:#ffbbbb"
| 124 || August 22 || Rangers || 30 – 3 || Gabbard (6-1) || Cabrera (3-9) || Littleton (1) || 21,828 || 58-66
|- style="background-color:#ffbbbb"
| 125 || August 22 || Rangers || 9 – 7 || Benoit (6-3) || Hoey (1-1) || Wilson (7) || 21,828 || 58-67
|- style="background-color:#ffbbbb"
| 126 || August 23 || Twins || 5 – 2 || Bonser (6-10) || Trachsel (6-8) || Guerrier (1) || 19,389 || 58-68
|- style="background-color:#ffbbbb"
| 127 || August 24 || Twins || 7 – 4 || Santana (14-9) || Hoey (1-2) || Nathan (28) || 29,742 || 58-69
|- style="background-color:#ffbbbb"
| 128 || August 25 || Twins || 8 – 1 || Garza (3-4) || Liz (0-1) || || 28,700 || 58-70
|- style="background-color:#ffbbbb"
| 129 || August 26 || Twins || 11 – 3 || Baker (7-6) || Bédard (13-5) || || 30,876 || 58-71
|- style="background-color:#ffbbbb"
| 130 || August 28 || Devil Rays || 15 – 8 || Dohmann (3-0) || Hoey (1-3) || || 17,781 || 58-72
|- style="background-color:#ffbbbb"
| 131 || August 29 || Devil Rays || 5 – 4  || Balfour (1-2) || Bell (3-3) || Reyes (21) || 16,944 || 58-73
|- style="background-color:#ffbbbb"
| 132 || August 30 || Devil Rays || 8 – 6 || Kazmir (11-8) || Guthrie (7-5) || Reyes (22) || 17,546 || 58-74
|- style="background-color:#bbffbb"
| 133 || August 31 || @ Red Sox || 9 – 8 || Birkins (1-1) || Tavárez (7-10) || Báez (3) || 36,810 || 59-74

|- style="background-color:#ffbbbb"
| 134 || September 1 || @ Red Sox || 10 – 0 || Buchholz (2-0) || Olson (1-3) || || 36,819 || 59-75
|- style="background-color:#ffbbbb"
| 135 || September 2 || @ Red Sox || 3 – 2 || Lester (3-0) || Cabrera (9-14) || Papelbon (31) || 36,340 || 59-76
|- style="background-color:#ffbbbb"
| 136 || September 3 || @ Devil Rays || 9 – 7 || Shields (11-8) || Hoey (1-4) || || 10,350 || 59-77
|- style="background-color:#bbffbb"
| 137 || September 4 || @ Devil Rays || 8 – 4 || Bradford (3-6) || Wheeler (1-7) || || 9,112 || 60-77
|- style="background-color:#ffbbbb"
| 138 || September 5 || @ Devil Rays || 17 – 2 || Sonnanstine (5-9) || Liz (0-2) || || 9,856 || 60-78
|- style="background-color:#ffbbbb"
| 139 || September 6 || Red Sox || 7 – 6 || Buchholz (3-0) || Báez (0-6) || Papelbon (34) || 27,472 || 60-79
|- style="background-color:#ffbbbb"
| 140 || September 7 || Red Sox || 4 – 0 || Lester (4-0) || Cabrera (9-15) || || 34,091 || 60-80
|- style="background-color:#bbffbb"
| 141 || September 8 || Red Sox || 11 – 5 || Leicester (1-1) || Matsuzaka (14-12) || || 48,043 || 61-80
|- style="background-color:#ffbbbb"
| 142 || September 9 || Red Sox || 3 – 2 || Beckett (18-6) || Bradford (3-7) || Papelbon (35) || 39,234 || 61-81
|- style="background-color:#ffbbbb"
| 143 || September 11 || Angels || 10 – 5  || Saunders (8-3) || Santos (1-5) || || 15,371 || 61-82
|- style="background-color:#ffbbbb"
| 144 || September 12 || Angels || 18 – 6 || Escobar (17-7) || Cabrera (9-16) || || 15,136 || 61-83
|- style="background-color:#bbffbb"
| 145 || September 13 || Angels || 3 – 0 || Leicester (2-1) || Lackey (16-9) || Walker (5) || 16,359 || 62-83
|- style="background-color:#bbffbb"
| 146 || September 14 || @ Blue Jays || 6 – 2 || Burres (6-5) || Litsch (5-9) || || 31,106 || 63-83
|- style="background-color:#ffbbbb"
| 147 || September 15 || @ Blue Jays || 8 – 3 || Halladay (15-7) || Birkins (1-2) || || 37,441 || 63-84
|- style="background-color:#bbffbb"
| 148 || September 16 || @ Blue Jays || 8 – 6  || Bell (4-3) || Frasor (1-5) || F. Cabrera (1) || 38,934 || 64-84
|- style="background-color:#ffbbbb"
| 149 || September 17 || @ Yankees || 8 – 5 || Hughes (4-3) || Cabrera (9-17) || Rivera (29) || 52,548 || 64-85
|- style="background-color:#ffbbbb"
| 150 || September 18 || @ Yankees || 12 – 0 || Mussina (10-10) || Leicester (2-2) || || 52,685 || 64-86
|- style="background-color:#ffbbbb"
| 151 || September 19 || @ Yankees || 2 – 1 || Pettitte (14-8) || Burres (6-6) || Rivera (30) || 53,857 || 64-87
|- style="background-color:#bbffbb"
| 152 || September 20 || @ Rangers || 6 – 3 || Walker (2-2) || Rheinecker (3-3) || || 20,136 || 65-87
|- style="background-color:#ffbbbb"
| 153 || September 21 || @ Rangers || 3 – 2 || Mendoza (1-0) || Santos (1-6) || Benoit (6) || 30,603 || 65-88
|- style="background-color:#bbffbb"
| 154 || September 22 || @ Rangers || 11 – 9 || Hoey (2-4) || Littleton (3-2) || Walker (6) || 40,148 || 66-88
|- style="background-color:#ffbbbb"
| 155 || September 23 || @ Rangers || 3 – 0 || Millwood (10-13) || Leicester (2-3) || Wilson (12) || 37,812 || 66-89
|- style="background-color:#bbffbb"
| 156 || September 24 || Royals || 3 – 2 || Walker (3-2) || Meche (9-13) || Bradford (2) || 15,769 || 67-89
|- style="background-color:#ffbbbb"
| 157 || September 25 || Blue Jays || 11 – 4 || Burnett (10-7) || Burres (6-7) || || 15,867 || 67-90
|- style="background-color:#ffbbbb"
| 158 || September 26 || Blue Jays || 8 – 5 || Halladay (16-7) || Zambrano (0-3) || Accardo (29) || 15,424 || 67-91
|- style="background-color:#bbffbb"
| 159 || September 27 || Blue Jays || 8 – 5 || Hoey (3-4) || Tallet (2-4) || Walker (7) || 15,817 || 68-91
|- style="background-color:#bbffbb"
| 160 || September 28 || Yankees || 10 – 9  || Bradford (4-7) || Ramírez (1-1) || || 38,113 || 69-91
|- style="background-color:#ffbbbb"
| 161 || September 29 || Yankees || 11 – 10 || Pettitte (15-9) || Cabrera (9-15) || Veras (2) || 47,616 || 69-92
|- style="background-color:#ffbbbb"
| 162 || September 30 || Yankees || 10 – 4 || Wright (2-0) || Burres (6-8) || || 43,589 || 69-93

Player stats

Batting

Starters by position
Note: Pos = Position; G = Games played; AB = At bats; H = Hits; Avg. = Batting average; HR = Home runs; RBI = Runs batted in

Other batters
Note: G = Games played; AB = At bats; H = Hits; Avg. = Batting average; HR = Home runs; RBI = Runs batted in

Pitching

Starting pitchers
Note: G = Games pitched; IP = Innings pitched; W = Wins; L = Losses; ERA = Earned run average; SO = Strikeouts

Other pitchers
Note: G = Games pitched; IP = Innings pitched; W = Wins; L = Losses; ERA = Earned run average; SO = Strikeouts

Relief pitchers
Note: G = Games pitched; IP = Inning pitched; SV = Saves; W = Wins; L = Losses; ERA = Earned run average; SO = Strikeouts

Team leaders

Batting

Pitching

Roster

Farm system

LEAGUE CHAMPIONS: Frederick

References

Game Logs:
1st Half: Baltimore Orioles Game Log on ESPN.com
2nd Half: Baltimore Orioles Game Log on ESPN.com
Batting Statistics: Baltimore Orioles Batting Stats on ESPN.com
Pitching Statistics: Baltimore Orioles Pitching Stats on ESPN.com
2007 Baltimore Orioles at Baseball Reference

Baltimore Orioles season
Baltimore Orioles seasons
Baltimore